The Harkness Trophy Race was an American auto racing event, first run in 1915 at the Sheepshead Bay Speedway at Sheepshead Bay, New York. The winner's trophy was named for Harry Harkness, one of the principal investors who purchased the Sheepshead Bay Race Track horse racing facility, and converted it to a wooden board automobile race track.

The purchase was completed in April 1915, and the first race named for Harkness was held on November 2 of that year.

The race ceased to exist after four years.  The Sheepshead Bay Speedway Corporation ran into financial difficulties, following the January, 1919, death of Harry Harkness.  The property was sold for residential real estate development.

Race results

Sources

http://www.champcarstats.com

Galpin, Darren;  A Record of Motorsport Racing Before World War I.

Harry S. Harkness dies of Influenza, New York Times, January 24, 1919

Auto races in the United States
Motorsport competitions in New York (state)